The 2009 Shakey's V-League (SVL) season was the sixth season of the Shakey's V-League. There were two indoor conferences for this season.

1st Conference 

The Shakey's V-League 6th Season 1st Conference was the ninth conference of Shakey's V-League, a collegiate women's volleyball league in the Philippines founded in 2004. The conference started April 19, 2009 at the Filoil Flying V Centre (formerly The Arena), San Juan. UAAP champion La Salle decided not to compete and took a leave of absence; UP replaced the Lady Archers to complete the eight-team elimination round roster. US Ambassador Kristie Kenney was the guest speaker during the opening ceremony.
 Venues
 Filoil Flying V Centre, San Juan
 Blue Eagle Gym, Quezon City

 Participating teams

Preliminary round 

 Exhibition game

|}
 Fourth-seed playoffs

|}

Quarterfinals

Final round 
 All series are best-of-3

 Final standings

 Individual awards

2nd Conference 

The Shakey's V-League 6th Season Open Conference was the tenth conference of Shakey's V-League, commenced on October 11, 2009 at The Arena in San Juan.

 Participating teams

Preliminary round

Quarterfinals 

 Fourth-seed playoffs

|}

Final round 
 All series are best-of-3

 Final standings 

 Individual awards

References 

2009 in Philippine sport